Dehydrogenase/reductase SDR family member 9 is an enzyme that in humans is encoded by the DHRS9 gene.

References

Further reading

External links